Aiturgan Myrzakmatova (born 29 December 1996) is a Kyrgyzstani individual rhythmic gymnast. She represents her nation at international competitions. 

She competed at the 2014 World Rhythmic Gymnastics Championships.

References 

1996 births
Kyrgyzstani rhythmic gymnasts
Living people